Peter Jay Sharp Theater may refer to several theaters named after the former owner of Douglas Elliman and the Carlyle Hotel:

an Off-Broadway stage at Playwrights Horizons
a theater at the Juilliard School
a theater at Symphony Space
The Peter Jay Sharp Building at the Brooklyn Academy of Music houses the Howard Gilman Opera House and the Rose Cinema.

See also 
Peter Jay (disambiguation)
Peter Sharp (disambiguation)